The Cua language (also known as Bòng Mieu) is a Mon–Khmer language spoken in the Quảng Ngãi and Quảng Nam provinces of Vietnam. Cua dialects include Kol (Kor, Cor, Co, Col, Dot, Yot) and Traw (Tràu, Dong). Maier & Burton (1981) is currently the most extensive Cua dictionary to date.

Classification
Paul Sidwell (2009) considers Cua to constitute an independent primary branch of Bahnaric, which he calls East Bahnaric. Cua has also had extensive contact with North Bahnaric languages. However, Sidwell (2002) had previously classified Cua as a Central Bahnaric language.

Phonology
The phonology of Cua, as cited by Sidwell (based on Maier 1969):

Consonants

Vowels

References

Sidwell, Paul. 2009. "How many branches in a tree? Cua and East (North) Bahnaric". In Evans, Bethwyn (ed). Discovering History Through Language: Papers in Honour of Malcolm Ross. Canberra: Pacific Linguistics.

Further reading
Burton, Eva. 1966. "A brief sketch of Cua clause structure."  Van-hóa Nguyêt-san 15: 187-90.
Maier, Jacqueline G. 1966. "Cua phonemes."  Van-hóa Nguyêt-san 15: 361-71.
Maier, Jacqueline G. and Eva Burton, compilers. 1966. Cua (Kool) dictionary.  [Manuscript] n.p.
Maier, Jacqueline G., Đinh Đổ, and Đinh Mốc. 1974. Bay hok pok Kool Kua = Bài học tiếng Cua = Cua language lessons.  Tủ sách ngôn-ngữ dân tộc thiểu số Việt Nam, 10. Saigon: Department of Education. viii, 37 p.
Maier, Jacqueline G. and Eva Burton. 1981.  Cua-English-Vietnamese Dictionary: 1981 Pre-publication Manuscript Based on a 1966 Manuscript. (Held by SIL, Dallas) 
Smith, Kenneth D. 1973. "Eastern North Bahnaric: Cua and Kotua."  Mon–Khmer Studies 4: 113-18.
Sidwell, Paul. 2010. "Cua (Kor) historical phonology and classification " Mon-Khmer Studies 39: 105-122.

Bahnaric languages
Languages of Vietnam